Robert Kaiser is the name of:

Robert Kaiser (footballer)
Robert Kaiser (Nazi leader), leader of the Reichsbund Deutsche Familie
Robert Blair Kaiser (1931–2015), American author and journalist, best known for his writing on the Catholic Church
Robert G. Kaiser (born 1943), American author and journalist on the Washington Post
Bob Kaiser (born 1950), American baseball player